A pile splice joins two segments of a driven pile, using either a weld (typical for H beams), grout or mechanical means (typical for precast concrete piles). Pile splices enable the use of shorter segments, which allows for driving piles in low-headroom situations such as under bridges or inside buildings. Reducing length of pile segments to under ~65 feet long also means the trailers that haul them to job sites can stay within state length limits.

References

Concrete
Deep foundations